John Holmquist is an American animator, director, designer, and storyboard artist. He has worked on several episodes of Rugrats as a director and storyboard artist from the late 1990s to early 2000s. Holmquist has also acted as a director for some episodes of Family Guy.

Career

For Klasky Csupo, Inc.
He has designed the main characters and appeared as a director for many episodes of the animated television series Rugrats from 1991 to 1998 and acts as a storyboard artist for other later episodes from 2001 to 2004 and the three theatrical films.

Here is a partial list of Rugrats episodes he has worked on:

As a director
 "Radio Daze"
 "Heatwave"
 "Faire Play"
 "The Art Fair"
 "Dust Bunnies"
 "Turtle Recall"
 "Angelica Orders Out"
 "Grandpa's Bad Bug"
 "Johnathan Babysits"
 "The Fugitive"
 "Uneasy Rider"
 "Babysitting Fluffy"
 "No Naps"
 "Chuckie's a Lefty"
 "Zoo Story"
 "Hand Me Downs"
 "The Jungle"
 "Pedal Pusher"
 "Silent Angelica"
 "Runaway Reptar"
 "Cooking With Susie"
 "A Dog's Life"
 "Thumbs Up"
 "Accidents Happen"
 "Bug Off"

As a storyboard artist / character designer
 "The First Cut"
 "Chuckie Grows"
 "Tommy's First Birthday"
 "Barbeque Story"
 "Waiter There's a Baby in My Soup"
 "At the Movies"
 "Reptar on Ice"
 "Baby Commercial"
 "Little Dude"
 "Lady Luck"
 "Real or Robots"
 "Special Delivery"
 "Ruthless Tommy"
 "Toy Palace"
 "Sand Ho!"
 "Grandpa's Teeth"
 "The Bank Trick"
 "The Santa Experience"
 "Let There Be Light"

In 1994–1999, Holmquist designed characters for Aaahh!!! Real Monsters.

Family Guy
Holmquist has also directed the following episodes:

 "Running Mates"
 "Airport '07"
 "Stewie Kills Lois"
 "Play it Again, Brian"
 "Ocean's Three and a Half"
 "We Love You, Conrad"
 "Hannah Banana"
 "Extra Large Medium"
 "Excellence in Broadcasting"
 "Leggo My Meg-O"
 "Yug Ylimaf"
 "Call Girl"
 "Finders Keepers"
 "Mom's the Word"
 "Brian the Closer"
 "Our Idiot Brian"
 "Pawtucket Pete"
 "Bri, Robot"
 "Start Me Up"
 "Christmas Is Coming"
 "Yacht Rocky"
 "La Famiglia Guy"
 "Bend or Blockbuster"

External links
 

Living people
American animators
American storyboard artists
American television directors
American animated film directors
Place of birth missing (living people)
Year of birth missing (living people)